National Tertiary Route 715, or just Route 715 (or ) is a National Road Route of Costa Rica, located in the Alajuela province.

Description
In Alajuela province the route covers Naranjo canton (Naranjo, San Miguel, El Rosario districts), Palmares canton (Zaragoza, Esquipulas districts).

References

Highways in Costa Rica